World's Christian Fundamentals Association, was an interdenominational organization founded in 1919 by the Baptist minister William Bell Riley of the First Baptist Church, Minneapolis, Minnesota. It was originally formed to launch "a new Protestantism" based upon premillennial interpretations of biblical prophecy, but soon turned its focus more towards opposition to evolution.

See also 
American Council of Christian Churches

References

Denominational alliances
Christian fundamentalism